Daniel Koch may refer to:

 Daniel Koch (physician) (born 1955), Swiss physician
 Daniel Koch (politician) (1816–1903), American politician

See also
 Wilhelm Daniel Joseph Koch (1771–1849), German physician and botanist